Alexander Nikolayevich Afinogenov (Skopin – 29 October 1941, Moscow) was a Russian and Soviet playwright.

Biography 
Alexander was born in the town of Skopin, in Ryazan Oblast. He joined the CPSU in 1922. He obtained a degree in journalism in 1924, the year that he published his first play. In the 1920s he was a member and later director of the Proletkult's theatre. He turned away from the Proletkult in the late 1920s, and became in the early 1930s the chief drama theoretician of the Russian Association of Proletarian Writers. He wrote 26 plays, but he is best known for Fear (1931) and Mashenka (1941). His work was attacked in 1936 and he was expelled from the CPSU in 1937, but he was never purged, and was rehabilitated in 1938. He continued writing until his death in a German air raid in 1941. He was married with American ballerina Jenny Marling (Schwartz). Her first husband was John Bovingdon.

Works 
His play Crank (Чудак) satirises bureaucracy, protectionism, and antisemitism. It was produced by the Second Moscow Art Theatre in 1929, in a production that featured Azarii Azarin as Volgin, Serafima Birman as Troshchina, and Sophia Giatsintova as Sima. His later plays Fear (Страх, 1931) and A Far Place (Далекое, 1935) were very popular with audiences; "he is distinguished among Soviet playwrights for his interest in personal psychological problems."

References

Sources 
 Solovyova, Inna. 1999. "The Theatre and Socialist Realism, 1929-1953." Trans. Jean Benedetti. In A History of Russian Theatre. Ed. Robert Leach and Victor Borovsky. Cambridge: Cambridge UP. 325-357. .

External links 
 article on Afinogenov 

1904 births
1941 deaths
People from Skopin
Russian dramatists and playwrights
Russian male dramatists and playwrights
Soviet dramatists and playwrights
Soviet male writers
20th-century Russian male writers
Soviet theatre directors
Expelled members of the Communist Party of the Soviet Union
Soviet civilians killed in World War II
Deaths by airstrike during World War II